William Norris Clarke, SJ (1 June 1915 - 10 June 2008) was an American Thomist philosopher and Jesuit priest. He was a president of the Metaphysical Society of America, as well as founder and editor of the International Philosophical Quarterly. 

Possessing a lively personality and restless intellect, Clarke did not allow his philosophical quest to be limited by traditional interpretations of the philosophy of St. Thomas Aquinas. He insisted that 

He was a major opponent of Neo-scholastic interpretations of Saint Thomas and Saint Anselm.

Books
 The  Philosophical  Approach  to  God:  A Contemporary  Neo-Thomistic  Perspective,  1979, revised edition in 2007. 
 Person and Being 1993; reprinted with  additional  commentary  by  Ranier  R.  A.  Ibana  as Person,  Being  and Ecology in 1996
 Explorations in Metaphysics: Being-God-Person , University of Notre Dame Press, 1995
 The One and the Many: A Contemporary Thomistic Metaphysics (2001)

Media
A Taste of Existence with W. Norris Clarke
A Creative Retrieval of Thomism with W. Norris Clarke, S.J.
A Reflection on God's Existence, by Fr. Norris Clarke

References

20th-century American philosophers
Philosophy academics
1915 births
2008 deaths
Presidents of the Metaphysical Society of America
Fordham University faculty
American priests
20th-century American clergy